King Henry School (formerly Erith Grammar School and later Erith School) is a large mixed bilateral secondary school and sixth form in Erith in the London Borough of Bexley for students aged 11 to 18. In October 2010, it became an Academy, and from September 2018 it merged with Townley Grammar School in Bexleyheath, forming the Odyssey Trust for Education, a multi-academy trust, and adopting its current name. It is located just off the A220, Bexley Road.

Admissions 
It was designated specialisms in Sports and Mathematics & Computing. Although a comprehensive, for the bilateral intake, many are selected on academic ability. Intake is banded and transfer from one band to another takes place, with each band being successively more academically demanding.

History 
The predecessor school to the current school was founded in the 1890s. Erith School was founded in 1967 by the amalgamation of Northumberland Heath Secondary Modern School and Erith Grammar School. Initially, Erith School was a ten-form entry school catering for students of all abilities. In 1972, it became a bilateral school, the only one in the London Borough of Bexley.

Between 1967 and 1997 the school was situated on two sites. The East Building, on Avenue Road, was the old Erith Grammar School, with buildings dating from the 1950s. The West Building, on Brook Street, was built in the 1930s and was the site of the Northumberland Heath Secondary Modern School.

In 1979, a "hands off Erith School" campaign successfully allowed the school to retain its status, following the announcement of plans by Bexley Council to either close the school or divide it.

Building work started in the spring of 1994 on a new, refurbished £6.5 million single-site school on the Avenue Road site, and was completed by December 1996. It was opened in January 1997, with a new teaching block, sports hall and all-weather astroturf facilities. The old West Building on Brook Street now houses Northumberland Heath Primary School.

In 2005, the school was awarded Specialist School status, recognising its excellence in PE, Maths and ICT. This was announced in a formal opening by Trevor Brooking. A new sixth form block, the David Friend Building, opened in May 2007. Its Community Sports Centre oversees usage during the evenings and weekends by a variety of teams.

In June 2018, the school was featured in the BBC documentary Grammar Schools: Who Will Get In?.

In September 2018, the school changed its name to King Henry School after joining Townley Grammar School to form a multi-academy trust, the Odyssey Trust for Education.

In September 2022 King Henry School started working with the Leigh Academies Trust to help address the issues listed within the Ofsted inspection report received earlier that year.

In February 2023, it was announced that the school would be renamed again to Leigh Academy Bexley, under the management of the Leigh Academies Trust.

Notable alumni 
 Jimmy Bullard (born 1978), footballer
 David Conner (born 1947), Anglican bishop and Dean of Windsor
 Felicity Palmer (born 1944), mezzo-soprano opera singer, professor at the Royal College of Music
 Keith Peacock (born 1945), professional footballer (Charlton Athletic) and manager
 Alan Knott (born 1946), professional cricketer (Kent, England)

See also 
 Beths Grammar School - former Bexley and Erith Technical High School

References

External links 
 School homepage

Secondary schools in the London Borough of Bexley
Educational institutions established in 1967
Academies in the London Borough of Bexley
Bilateral schools in England
1967 establishments in England